Maria Fortunata Scola Camerini (20 June 1864 Rovigo - 1937 Creazzo) was an Italian sculptor.

Life 
Maria Fortunata was born in Rovigo in 1864  to Count Giovanni Camerini, senator of the Kingdom of Italy , and Countess Luisa Raimondi di Podio.

She became interested in sculpture.  She was self-taught; she got to know Giovanni Dupré in Florence, whose studio she frequented during  stays with her father, who had commissioned a monument from him. 

She specialized in portraiture, creating numerous bronze busts, taking as a subject her family members and the personalities who frequented the family villa. Among them are the portrait of Isabella Camerini Valmarana, for the anti-tubercular dispensary of Ferrara, the portraits of her father, of Domenico Marangoni, of Antonio Fogazzaro, of the duke Carlo Capace Galeota, or of the count Fabio Sanminiatelli Zabarella, or the busts of Giovanni Battista Tenani and Alessandro Casalini .  The only known commission is that of a Christ for the Catholic University of Milan. 

In 1899 she exhibited three busts at the Venice Biennale. 

Maria Scola Camerini continued to sculpt until her death, in Creazzo in 1937, leaving the portrait of her son Giuseppe, an officer in the Air Force, who crashed in Aviano, unfinished.

References 

1864 births
1937 deaths
Italian women sculptors